Leshan, formerly known as Jiading or Jiazhou, is a prefecture-level city located at the confluence of the Dadu and Min rivers in Sichuan Province, China.

Leshan is a famous historical and cultural city with the reputation of "Begonia Fragrance Country". It is the first open-door city, model green city, excellent tourist city, national garden city and national health city. Leshan has three world-class heritage sites - world natural and cultural heritage Emei Mountain and Leshan Buddha, world irrigation project heritage Dongfengyan and so on.

History
The area of present day Leshan was the seat of historical Jiading city, which the historical Jiading city covered not entirely the same area with modern day Leshan city. Some of the area of Leshan county, was ceded to Emeishan city in 1958. In 1978, Leshan as a county-level city was formed. In 1985, the Leshan prefecture-level city was formed, which Emeishan and other county level cities were under the administration of Leshan. Before 1978, Leshan county-level city had Shizhong (means city centre), Wutongqiao (literally 5-"tong"-bridge) and Shawan (literally sand bay) three districts. The establishment of Leshan prefecture-level city, also saw the disestablishment of Leshan Dìqū, an administrative area that supervisee Leshan, as well as other county-level cities and counties.

Xinchang town, Jiading city, was known for late Qing uprising against the government.

Culture

Tourist attractions

In 1996, the Mount Emei Scenic Area, including the Leshan Giant Buddha, the largest stone-carved buddha in the world, which was declared a World Heritage Site by UNESCO. Next door to the Leshan Giant Buddha is the Oriental Buddha Park, a privately run cultural theme park, featuring thousands of reproductions of Buddha statues and Buddhist themed carvings.

Mount Emei is located within the county-level city of Emeishan, which is under the administrative jurisdiction of Leshan.

The ancestral home of Chinese writer, academic and politician Guo Moruo is preserved in the Shawan District of Leshan.

Dialect 
The Leshan dialect, part of the Southern linguistic system, is very different from the dialects of other cities in the province of Sichuan, which belong to the Northern system. Some researchers say the pronunciation of Leshan dialect represents an archaic form of Chinese pronunciation.

Food 
Falling into the Sichuan cuisine family, Leshan is noted for its food culture in that it has all the street food from its surrounding areas, which has made it the one-stop street food city. Typical specialties include:
Malatang - Hot and spicy soup
Boboji - Bobo chicken
Shaokao - Street barbecue
Qianwei Baobing - Qianwei Pancakes
Doufunao - Leshan Style DouFu Soup
Tianpiya - Sweet-Skinned Duck
Qiaojiao Niurou Leshan Style Beef Hotpot
Xiba Doufu Xiba Tofu
 Mi Liang Gao - A snack made with rice

Transport
There are Chengdu–Mianyang–Leshan intercity railway and Chengdu–Guiyang high-speed railway serving Leshan.

The Chengdu-Leshan Freeway with a total length of 160 kilometers, was finished on January 14, 2000. This Freeway has since become very important to the city's development.

Education
Leshan Normal University and Leshan Vocational & Technical College are two government-fund colleges in the city.

The Engineering&Technical College of Chengdu University of Technology is a non-government college, which was established in 2003.

Administrative divisions

Geography and climate
Leshan City is located in central Sichuan Province, southwest of the Sichuan Basin. Meishan borders on the north, Zigong and Yibin in the east, Liangshan in the south, and Ya'an in the west.Leshan city is located in the transition zone from Sichuan basin to southwest mountainous area, the overall trend is high in southwest, low in northeast, with wide difference in height.Landforms are mountainous, hilly, Pingba three types, mainly mountainous.

Leshan has a monsoon-influenced humid subtropical climate (Köppen Cwa) and is largely mild and humid. Summers are long, hot and humid, with highs often exceeding , yet extended heat waves are rare. Rainfall is light in winter and can be heavy in summer, and more than 70% of the annual total occurs from June to September.

Water resources 
Leshan City borders on numerous rivers, with Minjiang River, Dadu River, Qing Yi River and many small and medium-sized rivers, is a water-rich area.

Gallery

Sister cities
  Hervey Bay, Queensland, Australia
  Gilbert, Arizona, United States
 Ichikawa, Chiba, Japan, established due to Leshan native Guo Moruo residing there for 10 years with his wife, Sato Tomiko.
 Prachuap Khiri Khan,Thailand

Notable person
Dylan Wang
Guo Moruo
Zheng Shaoxiong
Ding Youjun
Huang shanglian

See also
 1786 Kangding-Luding earthquake

Notes

References

External links

Official Government Website

 
Cities in Sichuan
Prefecture-level divisions of Sichuan